Didemnidae, or Didemnidæ, is a family of colonial tunicates in the order Enterogona.

These marine animals are found in shallow water on the seabed. Members of this family have small zooids that form encrusting colonies. The body of each zooid is divided into a thorax and an abdomen.

Systematics 
The World Register of Marine Species lists the following genera:
 Atriolum Kott, 1983
 Clitella Kott, 2001
 Coelocormus Herdman, 1886
 Didemnum Savigny, 1816
 Diplosoma Macdonald, 1859
 Leptoclinides Bjerkan, 1905
 Lissoclinum Verrill, 1871
 Polysyncraton Nott, 1891
 Trididemnum Della Valle, 1881

Gallery

See also 
 Didemnin

References 

Aplousobranchia
Tunicate families